Carlos Rojas Gutiérrez (born 14 November 1954) is a Mexican politician affiliated with the Institutional Revolutionary Party. As of 2014 he served as Senator of the LVIII and LIX Legislatures of the Mexican Congress representing the Federal District and as Deputy of the LX Legislature. He also served as Secretary of Social Development from 1993 to 1998.

References

1954 births
Living people
Politicians from Mexico City
Members of the Senate of the Republic (Mexico)
Members of the Chamber of Deputies (Mexico)
Institutional Revolutionary Party politicians
20th-century Mexican politicians
21st-century Mexican politicians
National Autonomous University of Mexico alumni
Mexican Secretaries of Social Development